Jan N. Bremmer (born 18 December 1944) is a Dutch academic and historian. He served as a professor of Religious Studies and Theology at the University of Groningen. He specializes in history of ancient religion, especially ancient Greek religion and early Christianity.

Early life 

Jan N. Bremmer was born during the World War II in 1944 in Groningen, Netherlands. Though he became a liberal protestant later in life, he was brought up in an orthodox Calvinist family. His father Rolf Hendrik Bremmer was a Calvinist minister and a church historian, and his mother Lucy Lindeboom also came from a family of Calvinist ministers. His maternal great-grandfather Lucas Lindeboom (1845–1933) was a professor at the Kampen Theological College.

Bremmer studied Classics and Spanish at the Vrije Universiteit Amsterdam (1962–1970) and the University of Bristol (1969–1970). During 1970–1972, he did his military service with the Dutch Military Intelligence. He married Christine, a British citizen. They have one son and three daughters: Benjamin, Melissa, Rebecca and Daisy.

Academic career 

During 1972–74, Bremmer taught Classics at Christelijk Streeklyceum (Christian Regional Lyceum) in Ede, Netherlands. Subsequently he taught ancient history at the University of Utrecht, as an Assistant Professor (1974–1978) and as an Associate Professor (1978–1990). In 1979, he obtained a Ph.D. from the Vrije Universiteit with a dissertation on The Early Greek Conception of the Soul (published by Princeton University Press in 1983).

In 1990, Bremmer joined the University of Groningen as the Chair of Religious Studies, in Faculty of Theology and Religious Studies. He served as the dean of the Faculty during 1996–2005. He was the inaugural Getty Villa Professor at Malibu during 2006–2007. He served as a visiting professor at several other places, including the University of Edinburgh (2007). He retired from teaching in December 2009. In his farewell lecture in January 2010, he discussed the rise of Christianity through the eyes of scholars Edward Gibbon, Adolf von Harnack and Rodney Stark.

Works 

Author
 1983: The Early Greek Concept of the Soul,  Princeton University Press
 1994: Greek Religion,  Oxford University Press
 2002: The Rise and Fall of the Afterlife, Routledge
 2008: Greek Religion & Culture, the Bible and the Ancient Near East, Brill
 2010: The Rise of Christianity through the Eyes of Gibbon, Harnack and Rodney Stark, Barkhuis
 2014: Initiation into the Mysteries of the Ancient World, De Gruyter

Editor
 1987: Interpretations of Greek Mythology,  Croom Helm
 1989: From Sappho to De Sade, Routledge
 1991: A Cultural History of Gesture, Polity (with Herman Roodenburg)
 1992: Sacred History and Sacred Texts in Early Judaism, Kok Pharos (with F. García Martínez)
 1995: Between Poverty and the Pyre. Moments in the History of Widowhood Routledge (with Lourens P. van den Bosch)
 1996: The Apocryphal Acts of Paul and Thecla, Kok Pharos
 1997: A Cultural History of Humour, Polity (with Herman Roodenburg)
 1998: The Apocryphal Acts of Peter: Magic, Miracles and Gnosticism, Peeters
 2000: The Apocryphal Acts of Andrew, Peeters
 2001: The Apocryphal Acts of Thomas, Peeters
 2003: The Metamorphosis of Magic from Antiquity to the Middle Ages, Peeters (with  J. Veenstra)
 2006: Cultures of Conversions, Peeters (with W.J. van Bekkum and A.L. Molendijk)
 2006: Paradigms, Poetics and Politics of Conversion, Peeters (with W.J. van Bekkum and A.L. Molendijk)
 2007: The Strange World of Human Sacrifice, Peeters
 2007: The Visio Pauli and the Gnostic Apocalypse of Paul, Peeters (with I. Czachesz)
 2010: The Gods of Ancient Greece, Edinburgh University Press (with Andrew Erskine)
 2010: The Pseudo-Clementines, Peeters
 2012: Perpetua's Passions, Oxford University Press (with Marco Formisano)
 2015: The Materiality of Magic (Morphomata Vol. 20), Wilhelm Fink (with Dietrich Boschung)

See also
 Sisyphus fragment

References

External links 
 Academia profile
 Profile on New York University website

1944 births
Living people
20th-century Dutch historians
Academic staff of the University of Groningen
Vrije Universiteit Amsterdam alumni
Alumni of the University of Bristol
21st-century Dutch historians